Nesodes insularis is a species of beetle in the family Cerambycidae, the only species in the genus Nesodes.

References

Elaphidiini